Zhang Binbin (born 23 February 1989 in Xiang'an, Xiamen) is a Chinese shooter. She represented her country at the 2016 Summer Olympics, where she won the silver medal in the 50 metre rifle three positions event.

References 

1989 births
Living people
People from Xiamen
Sportspeople from Fuzhou
Chinese female sport shooters
Olympic shooters of China
Shooters at the 2016 Summer Olympics
2016 Olympic silver medalists for China
Asian Games medalists in shooting
Asian Games gold medalists for China
Asian Games bronze medalists for China
Shooters at the 2014 Asian Games
Medalists at the 2014 Asian Games
Shooters at the 2018 Asian Games
Olympic medalists in shooting
21st-century Chinese women